Blepharomyia is a genus of tachinid flies in the family Tachinidae.

Species
Blepharomyia angustifrons Herting, 1971
Blepharomyia foliacea Mesnil, 1975
Blepharomyia pagana (Meigen, 1824)
Blepharomyia piliceps (Zetterstedt, 1859)
Blepharomyia spinosa (Coquillett, 1897)
Blepharomyia tibialis (Curran, 1927)

References

Tachinidae genera
Diptera of Europe
Diptera of Asia
Dexiinae
Taxa named by Friedrich Moritz Brauer
Taxa named by Julius von Bergenstamm